The Jockey Club Derby Invitational Stakes is an American Grade III Thoroughbred horse race for three-year-olds run over a distance of one and one-half miles on the turf held annually in September at Belmont Park, Elmont, New York.  The purse for the event is US$1,000,000.

History
In 2019 the New York Racing Association with the influx of racino dollars created a new racing series for turf horses called the Turf Trinity. The Jockey Club Derby Invitational Stakes was positioned as the third and last leg of the new three race series held over the long distance of  miles with an impressive purse of US$1 million. The other events of the Turf Trinity are the Belmont Derby at Belmont Park and the Saratoga Derby at Saratoga. The winner earns an automatic berth to the Breeders' Cup Turf later in the racing season. 

NYRA previously held an event for three-year-olds over the one and one-half miles distance on the turf in the fall known as the Lawrence Realization Stakes which at one time held Grade II status and attracted many fine three-year-old stayers including Halo, Mac Diarmida and Golden Act. The event was discontinued in 2005.  

The inaugural running on 8 September 2019 was won by the American-bred Spanish Mission who was based in England. Spanish Mission defeated eight other entrants winning by the shortest of margins, a nose over the French-bred Pedro Cara with the Irish-bred San Huberto in third. Spanish Mission returned back to England and in 2020 was successful in winning the Listed Chester Stakes over a distance of  miles and the Group 2 Doncaster Cup held over the even longer distance of about  miles. Later, Spanish Mission travelled to Australia for the 2021 running of the Group 1 Melbourne Cup and finished third to the Australian champion Verry Elleegant.

In 2020 due to the COVID-19 pandemic in the United States, NYRA did not schedule the event in their updated and reformatted fall meeting.

In the 2021 renewal of the event seven entrants competed with the Godolphin's British-bred gelding Yibir victorious.  Yibir in his next start won the Breeders' Cup Turf at Del Mar Racetrack and was awarded the Eclipse Award for US Champion Male Turf Horse.

With the outstanding quality the event displayed, the American Graded Stakes Committee in 2022 upgraded the classification of the event to Grade III. Also the event in 2022 was moved to Aqueduct Racetrack due to infield tunnel and redevelopment work at Belmont Park. The event was won by the Irish-bred Nations Pride, who broke a track record that was set by Pebbles back in 1985 in a time of 2:24.14 with a -length victory.

Records
Speed record:
 miles: 2:24.14 – Nations Pride (IRE)  (2022) (new track record at Aqueduct)

Margins:
 lengths – Nations Pride (IRE)  (2022)

Most wins by an owner:
 2 – Godolphin Racing (2021, 2022)

Most wins by a jockey:
2 – Jamie Spencer (2019, 2021)

Most wins by a trainer:
 2 – Charlie Appleby (2021, 2022)

Winners

Legend:

See also
 List of American and Canadian Graded races

References

Graded stakes races in the United States
Grade 3 stakes races in the United States
2019 establishments in New York (state)
Horse races in New York (state)
Turf races in the United States
Recurring sporting events established in 2019
Belmont Park
Flat horse races for three-year-olds